The 2021 TCR Japan Touring Car Series season was the third season of the TCR Japan Touring Car Series. The series supported the 2021 Super Formula Championship.

Teams and drivers 
Yokohama is set to be the official tyre supplier.

Race calendar and results 
The calendar was announced on 10 February 2021 with 6 confirmed dates with all rounds held in Japan and supporting the Super Formula Championship.

Championship standings

Scoring systems

TCR Japan Series 

† – Drivers did not finish the race, but were classified as they completed over 75% of the race distance.

Entrants championship

Footnotes

References

External links 
 

TCR Japan Touring Car Series
Japan Touring Car Series